Michael Timothy Abrahams (born 7 April 1943) is an English guitarist and band leader, best known for being the original guitarist for Jethro Tull from 1967 to 1968 and the frontman for Blodwyn Pig.

Jethro Tull
Abrahams was born in Luton, Bedfordshire. He played on the album This Was recorded by Jethro Tull in 1968, but conflicts between Abrahams and Ian Anderson over the musical direction of the band led Abrahams to leave shortly after the album was finished, but not before contributing guitar to one further non-LP single. Abrahams wanted to pursue a more blues/rock direction, while Anderson wanted to incorporate more overt folk and jazz influences.

Blodwyn Pig and later career
Abrahams went on to found Blodwyn Pig and the group recorded two albums, Ahead Rings Out (1969) and Getting to This (1970) before breaking up in 1970. Abrahams soldiered on with the short-lived Wommett, then the Mick Abrahams Band and has continued to release albums by himself and with reunited versions of Blodwyn Pig. He has worked as a driver, lifeguard and financial consultant, occasionally playing gigs, especially to support causes in Dunstable, Bedfordshire.

According to his website, Abrahams suffered a heart attack in November 2009 and would have to recuperate before resuming work. In April 2010 his website revealed that he had Ménière's disease, which would hold him back from performing at least for another year. In December 2013, he posted an update referring to his continuing health problems and mentioning that he hoped to release an album in 2014.

In 2015, Abrahams announced a new studio album called Revived!, with several guests – among them, his replacement in Jethro Tull, Martin Barre.

Discography

Jethro Tull
 1968 This Was

Blodwyn Pig
 1969 Ahead Rings Out
 1970 Getting to This
 1997 Live at Lafayette (Bootleg)
 1999 Live at the Fillmore West: 3 August 1970 (Bootleg)
 1999 On Air: Rare Singles & Radio Sessions 1969–1989 (Bootleg)
 2000 The Basement Tapes
 2002 Live at the Marquee Club London 1974 (Official Bootleg)
 2003 Rough Gems (Official Bootleg No.2)
 2012 Radio Sessions '69 to '71

Mick Abrahams Band
 1971 A Musical Evening with Mick Abrahams
 1972 At Last
 1997 Live in Madrid
 2008 Amongst Vikings

Solo
 1971 Mick Abrahams
 1975 Have Fun Learning The Guitar with Mick Abrahams
 1991 All Said And Done
 1996 Mick's Back
 1996 One
 2000 Novox (Instrumental)
 2000 The Very Best of ABY (Compilation)
 2001 Music to the Play 'A Midsummer Night's Dream'''
 2001 This Was the First Album of Jethro Tull 
 2002 The Best of ABY Vol.2 2002 How Many Times (With Sharon Watson)
 2003 Can't Stop Now 2005 Back with the Blues Again 2005 Leaving Home Blues 2008 65... The Music 2013 Hoochie Coochie Man – Lost studio album – Secret Records
 2015 Revived!Reformed Blodwyn Pigs
 1993 Lies 1995 All Tore Down – Live 1996 Pig in the Middle 2000 See My Way 2004 All Said and Done 2005 Pigthology 2011 Times Have Changed (Reissue of Lies)
 2013 Cat Squirrel BluesThis Was Band
 2001 This Is (Live)Collaborations
 1971 : El Pea – Various Artists, Mick plays on "Greyhound Bus", the last song on the album. 
 2007 : Beggar's Farm – Itullians, Italian Jethro Tull Tribute band. With Bernardo Lanzetti ex-PFM and ex-Aqua Fragile, ex-Jethro Tull members Jonathan Noyce on bass and Clive Bunker on drums.

Freemasonry
Mick Abrahams is a Freemason and a member of the Chelsea Lodge No 3098, the lodge for members of the entertainment industry. He mentions this in some detail in his autobiography, What Is A Wommett?References

External links
Official Abrahams/Blodwyn Pig site
Bio from official Jethro Tull site
 Mick Abrahams – This Was The First Album of Jethro Tull: Mick Abrahams – This Was The First Album Of Jethro Tull
 El pea Various – El Pea
 Itullians Beggar's Farm'': BEGGAR'S FARM Itullians
Mick Abrahams Interview NAMM Oral History Library (2021)

1943 births
Living people
A&M Records artists
Blodwyn Pig members
Chrysalis Records artists
English rock guitarists
Island Records artists
Jethro Tull (band) members
People from Luton
People with Ménière's Disease
Screaming Lord Sutch and the Savages members